The 2016–17 FC Karpaty Lviv season is the 54th season in club history.

Review and events
On 1 June 2016 FC Karpaty gathered at club's base for medical inspection after vacations.

After changing 3 managers in a month due to various reasons, Karpaty went to training camp in Poland on 6 July 2016 with 3 friendly matches planned.

Competitions

Friendly matches

Pre-season

Mid-season

Winter break

Premier League

League table

Results summary

Matches

Relegation round

Matches

Ukrainian Cup

Squad information

Squad and statistics

Squad, appearances and goals

|-
|colspan="14"|Players away from the club on loan:

|-
|colspan="14"|Players featured for Karpaty but left before the end of the season:

|}

Goalscorers

Disciplinary record

Transfers

In

Out

Managerial changes

Sources

Karpaty Lviv
FC Karpaty Lviv seasons